Pentamethylcyclopentadienyl ruthenium dichloride is an organoruthenium chemistry with the formula [(C5(CH3)5)RuCl2]2, commonly abbreviated [Cp*RuCl2]2. This brown paramagnetic solid is a reagent in organometallic chemistry.  It is an unusual example of a compound that exists as isomers that differ in the intermetallic separation, a difference that is manifested in a number of physical properties.

Preparation, structure, reactions
The compound has C2h symmetry, with each metal atom having pseudo-octahedral geometry. In the crystal structure, two isomers are observed in the unit cell, one with a 2.93 Å ruthenium–ruthenium bond and the other with a long internuclear distance of 3.75 Å. The former isomer is diamagnetic, and the latter is magnetic.

It is prepared by the reaction of hydrated ruthenium trichloride with pentamethylcyclopentadiene.
2 Cp*H + 2 RuCl3·3H2O → [Cp*RuCl2]2 + 2 HCl + 6 H2O
The reaction is accompanied by formation of decamethylruthenocene.

Pentamethylcyclopentadienyl ruthenium dichloride can reduced to the diamagnetic tetramer of Ru(II):
2 [Cp*RuCl2]2 + 2 Zn → [Cp*RuCl]4 + 2 ZnCl2

Methoxide also can be used to produce a related diruthenium(II) derivative, which is also diamagnetic:

[Cp*RuCl2]2 + 3 NaOCH3 + HOCH3 → [Cp*RuOCH3]2] + 3 NaCl + CH2O + HCl
Treating the tetramer with 1,5-cyclooctadiene in etheral solvent gives the mononuclear complex chloro(1,5-cyclooctadiene)(pentamethylcyclopentadienyl)ruthenium(II).
0.25 [Cp*RuCl]4 + 1,5-cyclooctadiene → Cp*RuCl(1,5-cyclooctadiene)
Compounds like Cp*RuCl(1,5-cyclooctadiene), the tetramer [Cp*RuCl]4, and related diamagnetic Cp*Ru(III) complexes have been investigated as hydrogenation catalysts.

See also
 (Cymene)ruthenium dichloride dimer - [(cymene)RuCl2]2
 Pentamethylcyclopentadienyl iridium dichloride dimer - [Cp*IrCl2]2

References

Metallocenes
Organoruthenium compounds
Dimers (chemistry)
Pentamethylcyclopentadienyl complexes
Chloro complexes
Ruthenium(III) compounds